Tyler David Sylvester Burey (born 9 January 2001) is an English footballer who plays as a midfielder for Championship side Millwall.

Career
On 6 November 2018, Burey made his AFC Wimbledon debut in the EFL Trophy as the Dons beat Stevenage 4–0. He then made his Wimbledon league debut in a 2–0 away defeat to Charlton Athletic.
On 28 June 2019, Burey signed for Millwall after turning down a contract offer from AFC Wimbledon, with the two clubs agreeing a compensation fee. Burey made his Millwall debut as a late substitute in a 4–1 win against Huddersfield Town.

On 5 August 2021, it was announced that Burey had joined EFL League Two club Hartlepool United on loan until January 2022. He made his Hartlepool debut as a late substitute in a 1–0 victory against Crawley Town and assisted the winner for Gavan Holohan. On 14 August 2021, Burey scored his first professional goal in a 3–2 defeat to Barrow. 7 days later, Burey added his 2nd goal for the club against Walsall - beating his man and driving into the box, before curling an effort high into the far corner. On 28 August 2021, Burey netted his 3rd senior goal in a 2-1 win over rivals Carlisle United, receiving the ball from Will Goodwin on the edge of the box and curling an unstoppable effort into the top corner. This was Burey’s 3rd goal for the club in 4 games. 

He was named as Millwall's Young Player of the Season for 2021–22.

Personal life
Born in Hillingdon, Burey is of Jamaican descent.

Career statistics

Honours
Individual

 Millwall Young Player of the Season: 2021–22

References

External links
AFC Wimbledon profile

2001 births
Living people
English footballers
English people of Jamaican descent
Footballers from the London Borough of Hillingdon
Association football midfielders
AFC Wimbledon players
Millwall F.C. players
Hartlepool United F.C. players
English Football League players